In geology, a sediment trap is any topographic depression where sediments substantially accumulate over time. The size of a sediment trap can vary from a small lagoon to a large basin such as the Persian Gulf.

References 

Sediments
Sedimentary structures
Fluvial landforms